Jesinta Franklin (born 12 August 1991) is an Australian model and beauty pageant titleholder. Franklin won Miss Universe Australia 2010 and represented Australia at Miss Universe 2010, placing 2nd Runner-Up.

Early life
Franklin grew up in Gold Coast, Queensland, and attended Silkwood School during her youth and Aquinas College through her high school years.

Modelling career
Franklin was crowned Miss Universe Australia 2010 on 17 June 2010 representing Queensland. She later competed at the 2010 edition of the Miss Universe pageant on 23 August 2010 and finished as the 2nd Runner-Up behind Yendi Phillipps (Jamaica) and winner Ximena Navarrete (Mexico). She was also designated Miss Congeniality at this pageant.

In February 2016, Franklin became an ambassador for department store David Jones. This arrangement ended in December 2017.

Media career
Franklin (as Jesinta Campbell) published her first book, Live a Beautiful Life, in October 2016.

Television
In September 2010, she became a guest reporter for entertainment and fashion subjects on Seven Network's The Morning Show.

In October 2011, she appeared as a contestant on the Nine Network's The Celebrity Apprentice Australia as a member of Team Unity.

Radio
Franklin appeared on the Hot30 Countdown on 3 January 2012 and filled in for Maude Garrett with Matty Acton for one week. She came back as Matty Acton's co-host on 27 February 2012 on the Hot30 Countdown.

Personal life
Jesinta Franklin is married to Australian rules football player Lance Franklin, who plays for the Sydney Swans in the Australian Football League (AFL). They married in November 2016 in a private ceremony with close friends and family. In August 2019, Franklin announced that she was expecting her first child. Their daughter Tullulah was born in February 2020. In October 2020, Franklin announced that she was expecting her second child. Their son Rocky was born in March 2021.

References

External links

IMG Models profile
Franklin deletes Instagram post highlighting disparity in Cleo Smith’s rescue

Miss Universe 2010 contestants
People from the Gold Coast, Queensland
Living people
1991 births
Australian beauty pageant winners
The Apprentice Australia candidates
Australian female models
Miss Universe Australia winners